John Hare Powel (April 22, 1786 – June 14, 1856) was an American agriculturist, politician, art collector and philanthropist from Pennsylvania.

Early life and education
He was born John Powel Hare in Philadelphia, Pennsylvania, the youngest of the six children of Robert and Margaret Willing Hare. As a youth, he was adopted by his mother's widowed and childless sister, Elizabeth Willing Powel.  He legally changed his name when he attained his majority, and inherited the immense fortune of his late uncle, Samuel Powel.  He was educated at The Academy and College of Philadelphia and after college joined a counting house.  As part of his job in mercantile affairs, he traveled to Calcutta and returned at age 22 with twenty-two thousand dollars as his share of the profit.

Career
He served as Secretary of the American Legation in London from 1809 to 1811 under William Pinkney who was minister of England.

He returned to the United States in 1811, joined the Pennsylvania militia and served as Brigade-Major under Thomas Cadwalader at Camp Dupont.  During the War of 1812, he was Inspector-General of the Pennsylvania militia, and held the rank of colonel in the U.S. Army, while serving as Inspector-General, from 26 December 1814 to 15 June 1815.

After the war he devoted himself to agriculture, and did much to improve the breeding of cattle and sheep in the United States. He founded the Pennsylvania Agricultural Society in 1823, and published Memoirs of the Pennsylvania Agricultural Society (1824) and Hints for American Farmers (1827).

He served as one of the Charter Trustees for Lafayette College from 1826 to 1835.

He served as a Federalist member of the Pennsylvania State Senate for the 1st district from 1827 to 1830.

The Powels built a massive Greek-Revival mansion and estate in West Philadelphia, overlooking the Schuylkill River.  The mansion was named "Powelton" and was designed by the architect William Strickland.  In 1851, Powel sold Powelton to the Pennsylvania Railroad Company.  The railroad kept 30 acres along the river and sold the rest for development of residential housing.  The mansion was demolished in 1885, and the estate developed as the neighborhood Powelton Village.

Powel died in Newport, Rhode Island and is interred at the Christ Church Burial Ground in Philadelphia, Pennsylvania.

Personal life
He married Julia de Veaux of South Carolina in 1817.  She was the daughter of Andrew Deveaux.  Together they had nine children with seven who survived to adulthood.  John Hare Powel Jr. (1837–1890) served as lieutenant colonel of the 9th Rhode Island Infantry during the Civil War, colonel of the Artillery Company of Newport from 1865 to 1877 and mayor of Newport, Rhode Island from 1886 to 1888. One of his daughters, Julia De Veaux Powel, married William Parker Foulke and was the mother of the biologist Sara Gwendolen Foulke.

Legacy
Powell Hall at Lafayette College in Philadelphia, Pennsylvania is named in his honor
Powelton Village, the neighborhood in Philadelphia built on the former Powelton estate is named in honor of the Powels

Notes

References
This article incorporates text from the International Cyclopedia of 1890, a publication now in the public domain.
 

1786 births
1856 deaths
19th-century American politicians
American agriculturalists
Burials at Christ Church, Philadelphia
Lafayette College trustees
Pennsylvania state senators
People from Pennsylvania in the War of 1812
Politicians from Philadelphia